KJRT (88.3 FM) is a radio station broadcasting a religious radio format. Licensed to Amarillo, Texas, United States, the station is currently owned by the Kingdom Keys Network.

Repeaters
KJRT's programming is also heard on five other full powered stations.

Translators
KJRT also has six low-powered translators throughout the Texas panhandle, and one in Elk City, Oklahoma.

External links

JRT
JRT